Silver Hill is a mountain in Warren County, New Jersey.

Silver Hill may be considered an isolated outlier of Pohatcong Mountain; like Pohatcong Mountain it divides the watersheds of Pohatcong Creek on its northwestern flank and the Musconetcong River on its southeastern flank.

References

Mountains of New Jersey
Mountains of Warren County, New Jersey